Bertram Alexander Heffernan (born March 3, 1965) is an American former professional baseball player who played for the Seattle Mariners of Major League Baseball (MLB) in 1992. He played eight games in his major league career, with one hit in eleven at-bats.

Amateur career
A native of Centereach, New York, Heffernan played  collegiate baseball for  Clemson 1985-1988. His name is all over the Clemson record books, finishing his career third in hits (335), fifth in doubles (63), tied for seventh in triples (14), and his 507 total bases are sixth all-time. Heffernan had a career-year in his senior campaign, hitting .337 with 93 runs scored, 18 doubles, 21 stolen bases and 62 walks to just 27 strikeouts, earning him his lone First Team All-American nod.

In 1986, he played collegiate summer baseball with the Orleans Cardinals of the Cape Cod Baseball League. In 2002, he was inducted into the Clemson Hall of Fame.

Professional career
Heffernan was drafted by the Milwaukee Brewers in the 9th round of the 1988 Major League Baseball Draft and signed on June 2, 1988.

After playing in the minor leagues for Milwaukee, he was traded to the Los Angeles Dodgers in 1991, but would not play in the majors for them.

Bert played for the Ottawa Lynx AAA (Expos) in 1995 and 1996 winning the International League Championship in 95. Bert was one of the main contributors in the Championship run for the Lynx.

After leaving the lynx Bert went on to play in Taiwan for 2 seasons and then the Expos hired Heffernan to be part of the coaching staff of the Cape Fear Crocs.

References

External links

1965 births
Living people
Albuquerque Dukes players
American expatriate baseball players in Canada
Arizona League Giants players
Baseball players from New York (state)
Beloit Brewers players
Calgary Cannons players
El Paso Diablos players
Helena Brewers players
Jacksonville Suns players
Long Island Ducks players
Major League Baseball catchers
Orleans Firebirds players
Ottawa Lynx players
People from Centereach, New York
Phoenix Firebirds players
Seattle Mariners players
Shreveport Captains players
Sinon Bulls players
American expatriate baseball players in Taiwan